Montpon-Ménestérol is a commune in the Dordogne department in Nouvelle-Aquitaine in southwestern France. The commune was created in 1964 by the merger of the former communes Montpon-sur-l'Isle and Ménestérol-Montignac. Montpon-Ménestérol station has rail connections to Bordeaux, Périgueux, Brive-la-Gaillarde and Limoges.

Population
The population data given in the table below for 1962 and earlier refer to the former commune of Montpon-sur-l'Isle.

See also
Communes of the Dordogne department

References

Communes of Dordogne